Port Gamble Tribal Community is a census-designated place (CDP) corresponding to the Port Gamble S'Klallam Reservation in Kitsap County, Washington, United States. The population was 916 at the 2010 census.

Geography
The tribal community is in northern Kitsap County, on the east side of Port Gamble, an embayment of Hood Canal. It includes the unincorporated community of Little Boston. Directly across the bay to the west is the unincorporated community and historic district of Port Gamble.

References

External links
Port Gamble S'Klallam Tribe official website

Census-designated places in Kitsap County, Washington
Census-designated places in Washington (state)